Bangladesh Inland Water Transport Corporation or BIWTC, is a government-owned company that owns and operates river vessels and ships; and river ports in Bangladesh and is located in Dhaka, Bangladesh.

History
The company was founded in 1972 after the Liberation of Bangladesh. It was placed in charge of through the nationalisation of East Pakistan Shipping Corporation and other private shipping corporations.

References

Government-owned companies of Bangladesh
1972 establishments in Bangladesh
Water transport in Bangladesh
Organisations based in Dhaka